Louis II de la Trémoille (29 September 1460 – 24 February 1525), also known as La Trimouille, was a French general. He served under three kings: Charles VIII, Louis XII and Francis I. He was killed in combat at the Battle of Pavia.

Military career
Louis was born in Thouars, the eldest son of Louis I de la Trémoille. He commanded an army that attempted to secure Brittany for the French crown after internal revolts had weakened Francis II, Duke of Brittany during the so-called "Mad War" (La Guerre Folle). By March 1488, Louis had been appointed lieutenant-general of Brittany by Charles VIII. His decisive victory at the Battle of Saint-Aubin-du-Cormier on 28 July 1488 ended effective Breton independence.

Louis took part in several battles in the Italian Wars, notably the Battle of Fornovo in 1495 and the Battle of Agnadello of 1509.  He suffered a severe defeat at the Battle of Novara (1513), in which his 10,000-strong army was ambushed by 13,000 Swiss mercenaries.

Louis went on to secure a French victory at the Battle of Marignano in 1515, but he perished at the Battle of Pavia on 24 February 1525, where he died of a wound inflicted by an arquebus.  His death occurred during the climax of the battle when the French were surprised by 1500 Spanish arquebusiers.  La Trémoille and other high-ranking Frenchmen fought their way towards their king, Francis I, in order to protect him.  La Trémoille fell from his horse, shot through the heart.

Marriage 
On 28 July 1484, Louis married Gabrielle de Bourbon, daughter of Louis I, Count of Montpensier, they had:
Charles I de la Trémoille (1485-1515), married Louise de Coëtivy, they had:François II de La Trémoille

On 7 April 1517, Louis II de la Trémoille married 16-year-old Louise Borgia, Duchess of Valentinois, the only legitimate child of Cesare Borgia, Duke of Valentinois by his French wife Charlotte of Albret. The marriage was childless.

Titles
During the course of his career, Louis earned the titles Vicomte de Thouars, Prince de Talmond, Comte de Guînes et de Bénon, Baron de Sully, de Craon, de Montagu, de Mauléon et de l'Ile-Bouchard, Seigneur des Iles de Ré, de Rochefort et de Marans, and Premier Chambellan du Roi.

Legacy
Rue de La Trémoille, in the 8th arrondissement of Paris, is named after him.

See also
 La Trémoille family.

References

Sources

External links
 Laurent Vissiere, "Louis II de la Trémoille ou la découverte de l'Italie (1480-1525)"
 Heraldique Europeene

1460 births
1525 deaths
People from Poitou-Charentes
French generals
Military leaders of the Italian Wars
Deaths by firearm in Italy
French military personnel killed in action
Louis
Court of Francis I of France